Shannon Thunderbird is a Coast Tsimshian First Nations singer-songwriter, speaker, educator, recording artist, playwright, and author.

Biography
She is an Elder of the Giluts'aaw tribe, Royal House of Niis'gumiik, Gispwudwada (Orca) Clan. She is a medicine wheel teacher and artist/educator who communicates time-honoured indigenous knowledge in a variety of ways, workshops/seminars, drumming circles, stage shows, written word. Thunderbird has worked with thousands of people all over North America, Europe and Asia. In particular, she and her performance partner, Sandy Horne of the Canadian synthpop band the Spoons, have presented to over three hundred and fifty thousand students in elementary, secondary schools, universities and colleges across Canada and the United States. She is President of Teya Peya Productions, a First Nations arts/education company she founded in 1991 that includes the Thunderbird Native Theatre and Red Cedar Sisters Vocal Trio to which she is the Artistic Director.

Her touring shows include "Wolf Thunder: Big Drums Are Calling!", "Turtle Thunder Sings", "Sweet Thunder Medicine Wheel", "Daughter of the Copper Shield", "Thunder Rolling in the Mountains", Thunder Wolf Songwriting, Vocals and Drumming, Spirit Thunder Drumming and vocal workshops celebrating cultural diversity and North American indigenous cultures.

Thunderbird is a strong voice for Missing and Murdered Women and Girls. She is also a speaker on the culture, history and spirituality of Indigenous people. Her Fireside Chats, include: Seven Steps to the Colonization of Indigenous People; Power of the Matriarchy: Women Take Back the Drum; Indigenous Restorative Justice: Truth and Reconciliation; Truth and Timelessness of the Medicine Wheel.   She is a strong advocate for the right of Indigenous women to practice their culture wherever, whenever and however they choose. This includes the playing of the big drums.  She is currently the keeper of two big drums, Gyemk Loop and K'ool Gyet Nah Hool and speaks widely about the CORRECT history of Indigenous women and their powerful places within tribal structures including the creation of stories, songs, ceremonies and the playing of the big drums.

Written works
 Truth and Timelessness: Indigenous Medicine Wheel Knowledge. 2020
 Featured Contributor: We Do It This Way, ED. Dr. April Go Forth, Thoz Womenz Inc., Alturas, California, 2014 
 Featured Contributor: The Art of Living, A Practical Guide to Being Alive. ED. Claire Elizabeth Terry, Kairos, Spain, 2008.

Discography
 Wind Centre (released, March 2011 with Performance Partner, Sandy Horne.
 May Your Spirit Be Strong
 New CD, "Red Cedar Sisters" due out 2020.

References

External links
 Official website

First Nations dramatists and playwrights
First Nations musicians
Canadian storytellers
Women storytellers
Canadian women singers
Canadian women dramatists and playwrights
Canadian women novelists
Living people
Tsimshian people
21st-century Canadian dramatists and playwrights
21st-century Canadian women writers
First Nations women writers
First Nations novelists
Year of birth missing (living people)
21st-century First Nations writers